El Mercado Latino is a grocery and specialty store at Seattle's Pike Place Market, in the U.S. state of Washington.

Description 

El Mercado Latino is a female-owned grocery and specialty store on Post Alley in Pike Place Market's Sanitary Market building, in Seattle's Central Waterfront district. Seattle Best Places (1996) says, "The front of this diminutive store ... boasts a green grocery stocked with vegetables and fruits used in Caribbean, South American, Spanish Creole, and Thai cuisines."

The business sells Latin American foods and related products such as chili peppers, corn flour, dulce de leche, hot sauces, guava and passion fruit concentrates, Kaffir lime leaves, Lizano sauce, Mexican candies, Spanish saffron, and other spices. El Mercado Latino has also stocked canned goods, habaneros, Inca Kola, masa, tortillas, and other Mexican products. The shop serves empanadas on-site.

History 
Established in 1988, El Mercado Latino has been described as "one of Seattle's oldest Mexican grocery stores".

Reception 
In 2006, Neal Schindler of Seattle Weekly called El Mercado Latino a "hot-climate haven". The business topped Clive Irving's list of favorite Seattle shops for Condé Nast Traveler in 2011. In 2014, Thrillist's Chona Kasinger said the store "slings some of the city's best empanadas". Steven Hsieh included the business in The Stranger's 2017 "guide to Seattle for international students".

References

External links

 El Mercado Latino at Pike Place Market

1988 establishments in Washington (state)
American companies established in 1988
Central Waterfront, Seattle
Food retailers
Hispanic and Latino American culture in Seattle
Pike Place Market